Waldo Weatherbee is a fictional character in the Archie Comics universe. Mr. Weatherbee is the principal of Riverdale High School, where Archie Andrews is a student. To Riverdale students and (most) staff, he is commonly called Mr. Weatherbee, due to his authority position. Sometimes, Archie and his friends playfully call him The Bee. Mr. Weatherbee is a heavyset, no-nonsense man who dresses in fairly old-fashioned clothes, including wearing pince-nez eyeglasses perched on the tip of a vermiform nose and a tiny wisp of a toupee that perpetually flies off whenever he is upset or startled. Principal Weatherbee is portrayed by Peter James Bryant in Riverdale.

Fictional character biography

Pre-New Riverdale
Mr. Weatherbee's first appearance may be in Pep Comics #25 (March 1942), as a passenger of a taxi driven by Archie. The man grumbles about the poor driving and remarks to himself how his headmastership of the high school will prevent "go-nowheres" like him. When he begins school, he suddenly again runs into Archie, realizing that he is also a student at his high school, and that chance ride has caused Archie to start off on the wrong foot.  However, this character is not named, and he is not overweight.  The first unambiguous appearance of Mr. Weatherbee is in Jackpot Comics #5 (Spring 1942), where he is named, and has his customary girth.

Mr. Weatherbee is sometimes stated as having once been in the United States military, and saw conflict in war. Due to retconning and the "floating timeline" principle, the specific war has changed over time. Weatherbee's stated specific branch of the military has also varied over the years. According to a story in one of the digest magazines, Weatherbee was a helicopter pilot in the Vietnam War; however, a previous story had placed him as a veteran of World War II's Battle of the Bulge. Another story states Mr. Weatherbee was a former member of the United States Marine Corps. In a later story Mr. Weatherbee jests that his claim towards being in the "Battle of the Bulge" refers to his own battle against weight gain, which he has lost.

Mr. Weatherbee is shown in Little Archie stories as having been the principal of Riverdale Elementary School during the gang's grade school years. He eventually transferred to Riverdale High School at about the same time Archie started high school, as shown in a 2008 storyline.

In one story, Coach Kleats, explaining to Archie and his friends the value of not underestimating Weatherbee's physical prowess, mentions that Weatherbee was a good athlete in high school, excelling in football and baseball.

In Archie at Riverdale High #6 (April 1973), Archie's father accidentally reveals that Weatherbee was known as "Wild Willie" in high school. All subsequent reprints replaced "William" with "Waldo" and "Wild Willie" with "Wild Wally". Wild Wally was a troublemaker, and, after the kids find out, contrary to what he expects, they learn to appreciate it. However, this conflicts with other stories suggesting Waldo was quite studious in his teen years. Many stories feature Archie and his friends discovering that Mr. Weatherbee in his younger days was thin with red hair and had many adventures similar to Archie's. These stories often result in Archie worrying that as an adult, he will become more like Mr. Weatherbee.

He is a semi-active explorer and discovered some Malooka Indian relics on Mr. Lodge's grounds.

Weatherbee is constantly annoyed by Archie, so he often tries to avoid him. However, he cannot escape from Archie even in the summer months, as seen in various stories. One such story featured Mr. Weatherbee as the head of the camp where the Riverdale teens serve as junior counselors. He constantly dreams of the day when (or if) Archie graduates from high school and keeps a special calendar that counts the day until that event, although there are numerous stories in which Archie and his friends save him from various crises. There are also times when Weatherbee takes an interest in teaching Archie valuable lessons about life, nature, or things he enjoys. At times he even tries to hang out with the gang to be, as he says, more "in".  Although Archie often annoys Weatherbee, Weatherbee has admitted on several occasions that he is "really fond" of Archie and that he is one of his "favorite" students.

Mr. Weatherbee was particularly prominent in the comic series Archie and Me. Running from 1964 to 1987, the series featured stories specifically starring Mr. Weatherbee and Archie.

New Riverdale
Waldo Weatherbee first appears in Archie #1 (July 2015) while Archie is setting up for the school dance. In Jughead #1 (October 2015), he is forced into an early retirement due to the school board's decision to update to a modern curriculum meaning some of the teaching staff was replaced. But later, he is reinstated to his old position as principal. It is shown in Jughead #7 (vol.3) that he has a wife named Ramona.

Relationships
Despite Archie and Mr. Weatherbee's conflicts, Weatherbee is friends with Archie's father, Fred, even inviting him to lead the parents' association during one story. During that episode, Weatherbee also acknowledged that while Archie's school work has been careless at times, his grades were quite adequate.

While Weatherbee appears to be unpartnered, there has been speculation about the nature of his relationship with fellow Riverdale High veteran teacher Geraldine Grundy. A flashback in Veronica #200 (July 2010) showed the two having dated in their teen years.

In one Archie story where Dilton builds a time-machine, Mr. Weatherbee is shown to have been in love with a fellow student named Gwendolyn in his youth. After hearing his regrets about not getting together with her, Archie and Dilton go back in time to help him get the girl. Initially successful in introducing Weatherbee to Gwen, the plan ultimately fails when she finds out his ambition to become a teacher, which she says has no money in it. She then dumps Waldo. This was her only appearance in the series.

Despite the students' fear of Weatherbee, they still recognize his affection for the school and appreciate his efforts. In a story titled "Sheer Gratitude" in Archie's Double Digest #167 (March 2006), Weatherbee's age is said to be 65, the required age of retirement according to the rules of the Board of Education. Archie produces a petition from the entire school, however, and the Board agrees to let Weatherbee continue working at the high school.

Mr.Weatherbee used to have a wife in the golden age era. However, she was retconned out from the series. She is later reintroduced in the New Riverdale era as Ramona Weatherbee.

Relatives
In one story, Mr. Weatherbee's motorcycle-riding mother visits the school. During her visit, she refers to him as "Willy".

Mr. Weatherbee's niece Wendy Weatherbee first appeared in Tales From Riverdale Digest #10 (May 2006). She became a minor recurring character, noted for her quirky, eccentric interests, such as odd fashions and exotic pets. She is the daughter of Mr. Weatherbee's twin brother, Tony, as revealed in Tales From Riverdale Digest #28 (May 2008). The Weatherbee twins were very different as teenagers: Waldo focused on his career and education, while Tony focused more on girls and motorcycles (he opened his own motorcycle shop). Tony dated Miss Grundy when they were teenagers, but they parted. His friend Hiram Lodge apparently wanted to follow Tony's example, but instead settled down as a businessman and married Hermione.

Friends
The staff of Riverdale High School, Archie Andrews, Reggie Mantle, Betty Cooper, Veronica Lodge, Dilton Doiley, Moose Mason, Ethel Muggs, Chuck Clayton, Nancy Woods, Midge Klump, Kevin Keller, and other characters from Archie Comics.

Alternate versions
In the alternate futures shown in the series Life with Archie, Miss Grundy and Mr. Weatherbee realized they loved each other, and the couple finally married.  However, in this series, the former Miss Grundy died from kidney disease soon afterwards, leaving the portly principal a broken-hearted widower.

In Afterlife with Archie, Mr. Weatherbee is chaperoning the school dance with Miss Grundy. While on break, he reminisces with her about the time they snuck into Cypress Cemetery on Halloween when they were younger and makes references to Night of the Living Dead. He tells her there's nothing to be afraid of but is then mauled by a zombified Jughead.

In other media
Mr. Weatherbee has appeared to date in most Archie media adaptions.

Animation
 In the Filmation animated series, Mr. Weatherbee has certain fears about his mental health, owing to the "hallucinations" that he sometimes experiences. However, his fears are wholly unfounded and stem entirely from his accidental witnessing of Sabrina Spellman's (or sometimes her Aunt Hilda's) witchcraft. Typically, upon seeing such things as an elephant and a giraffe poking their heads out of the windows at Sabrina's house (as in the episode Hexter's Day Out) or Pop, the local malt shop proprietor flying by an aircraft window on a broom followed by Sabrina (as in Zelda's Racing Broom), he turns away and in a rather perturbed voice says "I didn't see that! I did not see that!" and often shouting "Nurse!"
 Weatherbee appears in Archie's Weird Mysteries, voiced by Tony Wike.

Live action
 In Archie: To Riverdale and Back Again, David Doyle portrayed him.
 In The CW TV series Riverdale, Mr. Weatherbee is portrayed by Peter James Bryant.

See also
Wendy Weatherbee
Riverdale High School (Archie Comics)

References

External links
 Comic Vine's entry on Mr. Weatherbee

Archie Comics characters
Fictional players of American football
Fictional principals and headteachers
Fictional soldiers
Fictional male sportspeople
Twin characters in comics
Fictional United States Marine Corps personnel
Comics characters introduced in 1942
Male characters in animation
Male characters in comics
Male characters in television
Characters created by Bob Montana